Auly is an urban-type settlement in Kamianske Raion of Dnipropetrovsk Oblast in Ukraine. It is located on the right bank of the Kamianske Reservoir northwest of the city of Kamianske. Auly belongs to Krynychky settlement hromada, one of the hromadas of Ukraine. Population: 

Until 18 July 2020, Auly belonged to Krynychky Raion. The raion was abolished in July 2020 as part of the administrative reform of Ukraine, which reduced the number of raions of Dnipropetrovsk Oblast to seven. The area of Krynychky Raion was merged into Kamianske Raion.

Economy

Transportation
The closest railway station is Voskobiinia on the railway line connecting Kamianske and Verkhivtseve. There is regular passenger traffic directly to Dnipro.
 
Auly has access to Highway H08 which connects Kamianske and Kremenchuk.

References

Urban-type settlements in Kamianske Raion
Populated places on the Dnieper in Ukraine